Matt Sweeney is a special effects artist who was nominated at the 68th Academy Awards in the category of Best Visual Effects along with Leslie Ekker, Michael Kanfer and Robert Legato. They were nominated for their work on the film Apollo 13.

Sweeney has received 3 Technical Achievement Awards at the Academy Awards.
59th Academy Awards: For the development of an automatic capsule gun for simulating bullet hits for motion picture special effects (with Lucinda Strub).
70th Academy Awards: For the development and realization of Liquid Synthetic Air (with James F. Foley, Charles Converse and F. Edward Gardner (of UCISCO); and to Robert W. Stoker, Jr.).
74th Academy Awards: For the concept, design and realization of the "Mic Rig" (with Mic Rodgers)

Selected filmography

The Goonies (1985)
Lethal Weapon 2 (1989)
Apollo 13 (1995)
Galaxy Quest (1999)
Fast and Furious (2009)

References

External links

Living people
Year of birth missing (living people)
Special effects people
Best Visual Effects BAFTA Award winners
Academy Award for Technical Achievement winners